The 2009 Indy Grand Prix of Sonoma was the fourteenth round of the 17-race 2009 IndyCar Series season, and was held on August 23, 2009 at the  Infineon Raceway in Sonoma, California. Will Power and Nelson Philippe both missed the race, after they were hospitalized after a practice accident on Saturday. Philippe spun at the blind turn 3A, and stalled the car on-track. E. J. Viso hit the Frenchman's car, before Power t-boned it a few seconds later. Power suffered fractures to two lumbar vertebrae, Philippe fractured his left foot and Viso escaped uninjured.

Grid

Race 

 * Marco Andretti was originally scored in eleventh, but was demoted behind Scott Dixon after the pair collided on the final lap.

Standings after the race 

Drivers' Championship standings

References 

Indy Grand Prix of Sonoma
Indy Grand Prix of Sonoma
Indy Grand Prix of Sonoma
Indy Grand Prix of Sonoma